The Cox-Uithoven House (also known as the Cedar Ridge Plantation, the Cox House, and the Dutch Village) is a historic house in Columbus, Lowndes County, Mississippi.

Location
It is located on Old Aberdeen Road in Columbus, Mississippi.

Overview

It has been listed on the National Register of Historic Places since May 8, 1980.

References

Houses on the National Register of Historic Places in Mississippi
Houses in Lowndes County, Mississippi
Greek Revival houses in Mississippi
National Register of Historic Places in Lowndes County, Mississippi